Brothers Grimm Prize of the University of Marburg is a literary prize of Hesse.

Winners

 1943 Karl Helm
 1950 Georg Baeseke
 1952 Erik Rooth
 1954 Hermann Teuchert
 1957 Gesenius G. Kloeke
 1959 Luis Hammerich
 1961 Emil Öhmann
 1963 Friedrich Stroh und Friedrich Maurer
 1965 Wolfgang Stammler
 1967 Friedrich Ohly
 1969 Jean Fourquet
 1971 Friedrich Neumann und Wilhelm Ebel
 1974 Winfred-Philipp Lehmann
 1977 Leopold Schmidt und Stefan Sonderegger
 1979 Adalbert Erler und Emil Skala
 1981 Kurt Ruh
 1983 Walter Schlesinger
 1985 Lutz Röhrich
 1987 Hans Fromm
 1989 Ruth Schmidt-Wiegand
 1991 Karl Stackmann
 1993 Hermann Bausinger
 1995 Arno Borst
 1997 Werner Ogris
 1999 Heinz Rölleke
 2002 Dietmar Willoweit
 2004 Rolf Wilhelm Brednich
 2007 Peter von Matt
 2009 Theo Kölzer
 2010 Hans-Jörg Uther
 2012 Heribert Prantl
 2014 Ruth Klüger
 2017 Heide Wunder
 2019 Maria Tatar

Literary awards of Hesse